The Assistant Secretary of State for European and Eurasian Affairs is a position within the United States Department of State that leads the Bureau of European and Eurasian Affairs charged with implementing American foreign policy in Europe and Eurasia, and with advising the Under Secretary for Political Affairs on matters relating to diplomatic missions within that area. Karen Donfried has served as Assistant Secretary since October 1, 2021.

Originally, the Department of State first established a Division of Western European Affairs in 1909, which handled European states primarily bordering on the Atlantic Ocean and their colonies. The Division of Near Eastern Affairs handled relations with most Central, Eastern, and Southern European countries until after World War I. During the interwar period, responsibility for much of Central and Eastern Europe shifted to the Division of European Affairs, although Greece, Turkey, and Cyprus were handled as part of the Near East until April 18, 1974. Following World War II, the Department completed the transfer of responsibility for the former colonies of European nations, except Canada, to the Bureaus of Near Eastern, South Asian, African Affairs, and Far Eastern Affairs.

The Department of State later established the Assistant Secretary of State for European Affairs in 1949. This came after the Commission on Organization of the Executive Branch of Government, also known as the Hoover Commission, recommended that certain offices be upgraded to bureau level after Congress had increased the number of Assistant Secretaries of State from six to ten. On September 14, 1983, an administrative action changed the title of the incumbent to Assistant Secretary of State for European and Canadian Affairs. On January 12, 1999, the title was changed back to Assistant Secretary for European Affairs.

Officeholders

References

External links

 
United States–European relations